Dorothy Jacqueline Keely (March 9, 1928 – December 16, 2017), professionally known as Keely Smith, was an American jazz and popular music singer, who performed and recorded extensively in the 1950s with then-husband Louis Prima, and throughout the 1960s as a solo artist.

Smith married Prima in 1953. The couple were stars throughout the entertainment business, including stage, television, motion pictures, hit records, and cabaret acts. They won a Grammy in 1959, its inaugural year, for their smash hit, "That Old Black Magic", which remained on the charts for 18 weeks.

Early years 
Smith was born in Norfolk, Virginia; her ancestry was Irish and Cherokee. Jesse Smith, her stepfather, was a carpenter, and her mother took in laundry to earn money to buy gowns for Smith to wear when she performed.

Career
When Smith was 11 years old, she sang regularly as a cast member of The Joe Brown Radio Gang program on a Norfolk station. At age 14, Smith sang with a naval air station band led by Saxie Dowell. At 15, she got her first paying job with the Earl Bennett band. She saw Louis Prima perform in New York City in 1949. They recorded together in 1949 and married on July 13, 1953.

Their songs included Johnny Mercer's and Harold Arlen's "That Old Black Magic", which was a Top 20 hit in the US in 1958. At the 1st Annual Grammy Awards in 1959, Smith and Prima won the first Grammy for Best Performance by a Vocal Group or Chorus for "That Old Black Magic". Her deadpan act was popular with fans. The duo followed up with the minor successes "I've Got You Under My Skin" and "Bei Mir Bist Du Schoen", a cover of the 1937 Andrews Sisters hit.

Smith and Prima's act was a mainstay of the Las Vegas lounge scene for much of the 1950s. Though her actual voice was not used, she was caricatured as "Squealy Smith" in Bob Clampett's 1960 Beany and Cecil episode "So What and the Seven Whatnots", a Snow White spoof in a Vegas setting.

Smith appeared with Prima in the movie Hey Boy! Hey Girl!, singing "Fever", and also appeared in and sang on the soundtrack of the previous year's film Thunder Road. Her song in Thunder Road was "Whippoorwill". She also appeared in the film Senior Prom.

Her first big solo hit was "I Wish You Love" in 1957, and it brought her a Grammy award nomination for Best Vocal Performance, Female. Her debut album by that same title achieved gold status In 1961, Smith divorced Prima. She then signed with Reprise Records, where her musical director was Nelson Riddle. In 1965, she had Top 20 hits in the United Kingdom with an album of Beatles compositions, Keely Smith Sings The John Lennon—Paul McCartney Songbook, and a single, "You're Breaking My Heart", which reached No. 14 in April.

She returned to singing in 1985, recording the album I'm in Love Again with Bud Shank, Bill Perkins and Bob Cooper. Her albums, Swing, Swing, Swing (2000), Keely Sings Sinatra (2001) for which she received a Grammy nomination, and Keely Swings Basie-Style With Strings (2002) won critical and popular acclaim. In 2008 she performed a duet with Kid Rock during the 50th Grammy Awards on "That Old Black Magic".

Smith earned positive reviews for her performances at Feinstein's nightclub in Manhattan in 2005. Said Variety: "Smith’s bold, dark voice took firm hold on a handful of great standard tunes, and she swung hard", and The New Yorker review called her "both legendary and underrated ... She can still sing the stuffing out of a ballad as well as swing any tune into the stratosphere."

According to a news release from her publicist issued upon her death, Smith was "very resolute in being in control of the trajectory of her career".

"Nobody will ever interfere with what I do on stage," Smith once told Theatermania. "Someone might have an opinion of something but, if I disagree with it, I'll go with my own thinking. I'm just a plain person. I sing like I talk — and, when I'm on stage, I talk just like I'm talking to you."

Smith's final performance was on Feb. 13, 2011, at the Cerritos Performing Arts Center in Southern California.

Personal life
Smith first married Matteo Gambardella Jr., September 6, 1947, in Pasquotank County, North Carolina, before divorcing December 1950. Smith married Louis Prima July 13, 1953. in Virginia Beach They had two children, Toni Elizabeth and Luanne Francis.  Smith had an affair with Frank Sinatra prior to her divorce from Prima in 1961. She also had a relationship with Clint Eastwood. She married Jimmy Bowen in 1965. The couple divorced in 1969. In 1975 Smith married singer Bobby Milano (real name Charles Caci) in Palm Springs. Sinatra gave the bride away.

On December 16, 2017, Smith died of apparent heart failure in Palm Springs, California, at the age of 89. She is buried at Forest Lawn Memorial Park, Hollywood Hills.

Legacy
In 1998, a Golden Palm Star on the Palm Springs Walk of Stars was dedicated to her. She also has a star at 7080 Hollywood Boulevard in the Recording section of the Hollywood Walk of Fame. It was dedicated on September 22, 1998.

Discography

Solo albums

 1957 I Wish You Love (Capitol)
 1958 Politely! (Capitol)
 1959 Swingin' Pretty (Capitol)
 1959 Be My Love (Dot)
 1960 Swing, You Lovers (Dot)
 1960 A Keely Christmas (Dot)
 1961 Twist with Keely Smith (Dot)
 1961 Dearly Beloved (Dot)
 1962 Because You're Mine (Dot)
 1962 What Kind of Fool Am I? (Dot)
 1962 Cherokeely Swings (Dot)
 1963 Little Girl Blue/Little Girl New (Reprise)
 1964 The Intimate Keely Smith (Reprise)
 1964 Keely Smith Sings the John Lennon—Paul McCartney Songbook (Reprise)
 1965 That Old Black Magic (Reprise)
 1985 I'm in Love Again (Fantasy)
 2000 Swing, Swing, Swing (Concord)
 2001 Keely Sings Sinatra (Concord)
 2002 Keely Swings Basie-Style With Strings (Concord)
 2005 Vegas '58 – Today (Recorded Live At Feinstein's At The Regency) (Concord)

With Louis Prima

 1958 Breaking It Up! (Columbia)
 1959 Louis and Keely! (Dot)
 1959 Louis Prima & Keely Smith on Broadway (Coronet)
 1960 Louis Prima Digs Keely Smith (Coronet)
 1960 Together (Dot)
 1961 Return of the Wildest! (Dot)

With Louis Prima, Sam Butera & The Witnesses

 1957 The Call of the Wildest (Capitol)
 1957 The Wildest Show at Tahoe (Capitol)
 1958 Las Vegas Prima Style (Capitol)
 1959 Hey Boy! Hey Girl! (Capitol)
 1960 On Stage'' (Dot)

Notes

References

External links
 
 NPR: "Keely Smith: A Swingin' Icon of Early Vegas"
 Interview by KUOW-FM's Amanda Wilde
 

1928 births
2017 deaths
American women pop singers
Native American singers
American women jazz singers
American jazz singers
Singers from Virginia
Musicians from Norfolk, Virginia
American people of Irish descent
Capitol Records artists
Dot Records artists
Reprise Records artists
Concord Records artists
Grammy Award winners
Nightclub performers
Burials at Forest Lawn Memorial Park (Hollywood Hills)
Jazz musicians from Virginia
Traditional pop music singers
21st-century American women